Delaware's 1st Senate district is one of 21 districts in the Delaware Senate. It has been represented by Democrat Sarah McBride since 2020, succeeding fellow Democrat Harris McDowell III; McBride is the first openly transgender state senator in American history.

Geography
District 1 covers the northeastern tip of New Castle County along the Delaware River, including Claymont, Bellefonte, most of Edgemoor, and parts of northern Wilmington.

Like all districts in the state, the 1st Senate district is located entirely within Delaware's at-large congressional district. It overlaps with the 1st, 3rd, 4th, 6th, 7th, and 10th districts of the Delaware House of Representatives. The district borders New Jersey via the Delaware River and Pennsylvania via the Twelve-Mile Circle.

Recent election results
Delaware Senators are elected to staggered four-year terms. Under normal circumstances, the 1st district holds elections in presidential years, except immediately after redistricting, when all seats are up for election regardless of usual cycle.

2020

2016

2012

Federal and statewide results in District 1

References 

1
New Castle County, Delaware